Boarhills railway station served the hamlet of Boarhills, Fife, Scotland from 1883 to 1930 on the Anstruther and St Andrews Railway.

History 

To the north was the goods yard able to accommodate livestock, the yard was equipped with a 1½ ton crane.

The station was host to a LNER camping coach from 1935 to 1939.

The station closed on 1 January 1917, reopening on 1 February 1919 then closed to passengers on 22 September 1930, although there was occasional later excursion use as the line remained open. The line and station closed to goods on 6 September 1965.

References

External links 
 Boarhills station on Railscot

Disused railway stations in Fife
Railway stations in Great Britain opened in 1883
Railway stations in Great Britain closed in 1917
Railway stations in Great Britain opened in 1919
Railway stations in Great Britain closed in 1930
1887 establishments in Scotland
1930 disestablishments in Scotland
Former North British Railway stations